Marie-Zélia Lafont (born 9 January 1987) is a French slalom canoeist who has competed at the international level since 2003.

She won two medals in the K1 team event at the ICF Canoe Slalom World Championships, with a gold in 2018 and a bronze in 2015. She also won two golds and three bronzes at the European Championships.

Lafont participated in two Olympic Games. She finished in 16th place in the K1 event at the 2016 Summer Olympics in Rio de Janeiro and 14th in the K1 event at the 2020 Summer Olympics in Tokyo.

World Cup individual podiums

References

External links

Marie-Zelia LAFONT at CanoeSlalom.net

French female canoeists
Living people
1987 births
Canoeists at the 2016 Summer Olympics
Olympic canoeists of France
Medalists at the ICF Canoe Slalom World Championships
People from Orthez
Sportspeople from Pyrénées-Atlantiques
Canoeists at the 2020 Summer Olympics